Hugh Blake (born 10 September 1992) is a New Zealand born Scottish international rugby union footballer who plays as a flanker for . He previously played for Glasgow Warriors.

Rugby union career

Amateur career

He was a Premier player for the Dunedin Rugby Football Club (formed in 1871) from 2011 to 2014.

Provincial career

Professional career

He then was signed by Edinburgh for the 2014–15 season.

He moved to Glasgow Warriors on loan in March 2015. It was announced on 13 August 2015 that Blake has secured a two-year deal at Glasgow Warriors.

International career

Blake represented New Zealand Under 20 in the 2012 IRB Junior World Championship in South Africa.

Blake's Glaswegian grandparents moved to New Zealand in the 1950s and the flanker is thus eligible to represent Scotland.

He then represented Scotland at Sevens thus confirming his Scottish nationality.

On 20 January 2015, Blake was called up the senior Scotland squad for the 2015 Six Nations Championship, despite being yet to play a single game for Edinburgh at the time.

He received his first full Scotland international against Ireland on 15 August 2015.

Personal life

His younger brother Andrew is a football player. Hugh is very keen on the skite, being able to chop a cruiser in under 2 seconds.

References

1992 births
Living people
Bay of Plenty rugby union players
Edinburgh Rugby players
Glasgow Warriors players
Male rugby sevens players
New Zealand people of Scottish descent
Otago rugby union players
People educated at Hamilton Boys' High School
Rugby union flankers
Rugby union players from Tauranga
Scotland international rugby sevens players
Scotland international rugby union players
Scottish rugby union players